KRI Bung Karno (369) is a corvette and presidential yacht to be operated by the Indonesian Navy. Designated as "VVIP and Presidential Helicopter-carrying Guided-missile Corvette", the ship was named after the First President of Indonesia Sukarno and currently under construction.

Design and description 
The corvette will be powered by two diesel engines generating . Bung Karno has a complement of 55 personnel.

The ship will be armed with one Leonardo's OTO Marlin 40 turret, two 20 mm autocannons and an unspecified guided-missile. The corvette was planned to be fitted with torpedo and sonar in the future.

In its role as presidential yacht, Bung Karno will be replacing . The ship was planned to have bulletproof VVIP accommodation and able to function as command ship in times of emergency.

Construction and career 
The ship's construction was began with first steel cutting and keel laying ceremony on 9 June 2022 at PT Karimun Anugrah Sejati shipyard in Batam, Riau Islands. On 20 June, the corvette was officially named as KRI Bung Karno (369) in the ship naming ceremony by then-Chief of Staff of the Navy Admiral Yudo Margono and Megawati Sukarnoputri, the 5th President of Indonesia and daughter of the ship's namesake. As of June 2022, the ship was planned to be built in 12 months and completed in February 2023.

References

2023 ships
Ships built in Indonesia
Corvettes of Indonesia
Corvettes of the Indonesian Navy
Royal and presidential yachts